Newton North High School, formerly Newton High School, is the larger and longer-established of two public high schools in Newton, Massachusetts, the other being Newton South High School. It is located in the village of Newtonville. The school from 2009 to 2010 underwent controversial reconstruction of its facility, making it one of the largest and most expensive high schools ever built in the United States, with a price tag of nearly US$200 million. The new building opened for classes in September 2010.

History
In the 1850s, high school classes in Newton were conducted in buildings shared with grammar schools in the villages of Newton Centre, West Newton, Upper Falls, and Newton Corner. In 1859, Newton's population topped 8,000 residents for the first time, a threshold that required the town under Massachusetts state law to construct a separate high school. Newton High School's first principal was J.N. Beals, for whom the current Beals House was named. Beals also served as one of the new school's two teachers, along with Amy Breck. Beals left the job for health reasons after only one year and was replaced by E.D. Adams, for whom the current Adams House was named.

The first Newton High School building, located on Walnut Street in Newtonville, opened in September 1859, and was modified in 1875. In 1898, the original building was replaced with a new building, also on Walnut Street. This building, the Classical Newton High School, eventually became known as Building I. The next building (Building II, circa 1906) was the Vocational High School, and the third building of the Newton High School complex (Building III) opened in 1926 on Walnut Street. A field house/gymnasium building (also known as "the drill shed"), adjacent to Building I, was also part of the complex, as were the athletic fields. Buildings I, II, and III were connected to each other via a series of maintenance tunnels. Newton High School was Newton's only public high school for more than 100 years until 1960, when Newton South High School opened.

Newton High School was renamed Newton North High School in 1973 when a new building opened on Lowell Avenue. The first graduating class as "Newton North High School" was in the spring of 1974. After Newton North was built, all of the former "Newton High School" buildings were demolished.

Reconstruction 

By 2003, the "old" Newton North building was 30 years old and aging poorly, with leaks, poor ventilation and crumbling stairs. After extensive community debate and a citizen review panel, a decision was reached to construct a replacement high school, with the final cost ultimately totaling $197.5 million, making it one of the most expensive high schools ever built in the state. A project consultant explained that the project's relatively high cost was partly due to demolition of the existing  building, hazardous material abatement in the existing building, and the new school's complex program, which includes a natatorium, vocational technology education program, and culinary arts facilities.

At a public hearing in June 2006, community residents criticized the plan for its cost and for creating a new four-way intersection at Walnut Street and Trowbridge Avenue. Others claimed the proposed north–south orientation and lack of a basement level would waste energy as compared to the current structure. Nonetheless, after a public referendum and vote in January 2007, Newton residents approved the current plan for a new building.

Gund Partnership designed the new building, and Dore and Whittier Architects was the Architect of Record. Dimeo Construction Company was the construction manager and general contractor for the project. The removal of the asbestos, laden throughout the existing building, was priced at $10 million. The building was dismantled, with contaminated construction debris packaged in lined cardboard boxes and shipped out in 650 trailer loads.

The new building is oriented on a north–south axis on the eastern side of the current lot, with athletic fields to the west and a soccer field on the east side. The main entrance has returned to Walnut Street, as was the case from 1859 to 1973. The new building places the school office in a more accessible location – it was on the third floor in the old building – and ensures that most classrooms have natural light and windows to the outside.

The  school incorporates many features that improve energy efficiency, and is among the first LEED-certified schools in the state. Green features include rooftop solar panels, systems to reuse rainwater, interior materials with low emission of volatile organic compounds, and occupancy motion sensors. Unlike the previous school building, where 50 percent of the classrooms did not have windows or access to daylight, classrooms in the new school receive natural light; light fixtures are dimmed based on the amount of daylight to conserve energy. In 2020, solar canopies were constructed over the main parking lots.

House system
The school is divided into administrative units called "Houses". Each has its own office, secretary, and Dean (formerly "Housemaster"), who deals with administrative and disciplinary matters for house students. The House system was designed to provide better communication, distributed administration, more personal attention to individuals, a smaller peer group for students, more practical social events, and intra-house athletic teams. The houses are Adams, Barry, Beals and Riley, with each year group occupying one house. In the period of its largest population (≈3,000 students in the 1960s and later), there were six houses – the two additional houses being Bacon and Palmer – which also contained student common rooms and teachers' lounges. Originally, students in the same class were broken up into different houses; now the four houses correspond to the four grade levels. Students remain in the same house throughout their four years at Newton North. Houses are named for notable former principals, such as J.N. Beals and E.D. Adams.

Academics
Newton North offers both traditional college-preparatory academic courses along with technical and vocational training. Traditional courses in the humanities and the sciences are streamed, often with College Prep, Advanced College Prep, Honors and Advanced Placement options. Starting with the 2014–2015 school year, course levels were renamed to College Prep (formerly CII), Advanced College Prep (formerly (CI), and Honors/Advanced Placement (no change). Non-standard courses include video production, architecture, automobile repair, and biodiesel production.

Newton North held the sixth position in Boston Magazines 2010 rankings of public high schools.

Greengineering
During the academic year of 2009/2010 a Greengineering course was added in the Career and Tech. Ed. Department at Newton North High School. The course taught students how to produce biodiesel, make fused plastic bags, and grow algae that would later be processed into fuel. The biodiesel was sold to a recycling company as well as the community at large. This program was the first of its kind in both Massachusetts and the United States. Greengineering was renewed for the academic year of 2010/2011 with additions to curriculum for Greengineering 101 and a new Greengineering 201 course. They had started creating a styrofoam type material using mycelium. They planned to use it to replace the need for non-green styrofoam and to create a surfboard made of fiberglass-coated mycelium. During the 2016–2017 school year, Greengineering had multiple new subject areas including pedal power and aquaponics. However, in the beginning of the 2018 school year, Greengineering came to an end and was replaced with a new Sustainability course.

Partnerships and exchanges
Students studying foreign languages have the opportunity to participate in one of several international exchange programs. In addition, Newton North participates in the Newton-Beijing Jingshan School Exchange Program. The city of Newton hosts students and teachers for four months each fall and sends students and teachers to Beijing each spring.

Extracurriculars

Clubs and societies

Competitive clubs at the school include History Team, Model United Nations, Mock Trial Team, Debate Team, Mathematics Team, Science Team, and a FIRST Robotics Competition team: The LigerBots 2877. Newton North's Science Team has entered national and regional competitions. Newton North's History Team is ranked within the top half of teams, nationally, and has won several regional history bees.

In the 2011–2012 school year, the science team placed first at MIT Trivia, Envirothon, and JETS. In 1993 the team's Science Bowl division won the state championship and placed 3rd nationally. They won the Science Olympiad State competition in 1995, 2004, 2007, 2008, and 2009, and have represented Massachusetts at the national competition.

In the 2013–2014 school year, the LigerBots won the WPI District Competition, were finalists at the Northeastern University District Competition, and placed for the FIRST Championship in St. Louis. In the 2014–2015 school year, the LigerBots were semi-finalists and Chairman's Award winners at the UMass Dartmouth Competition, were finalists at the Northeastern competition, won the NE Regional Chairman's award, and placed for the FIRST World Championship in St. Louis. In the 2015–2016 school year, the LigerBots won the Entrepreneurship Award at the WPI competition, as well as the Innovation in Control Award at both the Boston University District Competition and the New England District Championship competition. In the 2017–2018 school year the team  won the Imagery Award and Engineering Inspiration Award at the district level, and qualified for the FIRST World Championships.

The Chess Club has sent teams of four players to the tournament yearly for the past two decades. The school team won the championships in 2002, 2009, 2010, and 2012. In 2016 they placed second to two-time champions Lincoln-Sudbury Regional High School. In 2018 they once again placed second after losing in the final round to the eventual champions BBN, 1.5 -2.5. The last time an individual player has won the state title was Jacob Fauman in 2012. The current school team has top 50 nationally ranked chess players in their age group and top 25 finishers at the last national grade championships. The club itself has USCF Club affiliation and a Club TD (who is a student), something that no other high school in Massachusetts has.

Student government
Newton North has a long-running student government system, which includes a president and multiple vice-presidents of each class, as well as the Student-Faculty Administration, a liaison between students and teachers.

In the 2020–2021 school year, the class of 2024 student government was the only grade to have elections by submitting a speech video. The class also had a record high of candidates for the election, with 38 students running.

Student publications
Newton North publishes a monthly student newspaper, The Newtonite, founded in 1922. The paper has a circulation of 2000 issues. Students contribute to the paper through credited journalism courses. The Newtonite has won crowns from the Columbia Scholastic Press Association – the Gold Crown in 2001, and the Silver Crown in 2002 – among other scholastic journalism awards. Students also design and publish The Newtonian, the school's yearbook, which printed its 101st edition in 2011. Thoughtprints, published once a year, is the school's student-run literary magazine, featuring only student submissions. In 2010, the magazine included a CD of student-written music for the first time.

Tiger Magazine is Newton North's video production class' monthly cable television program. It airs on Newton's NewTV local cable station. The content of the program is generally a mixture of comedy pieces, news, and community based documentary, as well as experimental and dramatic video works. Several Tiger Magazine alumni have gone on to pursue careers in the film industry, and numerous pieces originally aired on Tiger Magazine have won awards in local and national video contests. Near the end of the 2011–2012 school year, the name of the show was changed to Tiger Tube.

Athletics

Newton North competes in the Bay State League with other suburban Boston public schools. Since 1894, the boys' football team has played rival Brookline High School in the traditional Thanksgiving Day game. This is one of the oldest high school football rivalries in Massachusetts.

Newton North offers football, boys' and girls' soccer, boys' and girls' track and cross country, boys' and girls' basketball, boys' and girls' volleyball, golf, baseball, softball, boys' and girls' lacrosse, field hockey, alpine skiing, Nordic skiing, tennis, and many other sports.

Track and field
The track teams at Newton North have remained some of the top teams in the state since the inception of state-level competition. Beginning with Newton High School's first state title in 1922, the boys' track teams have won the Division I / Class A state championship 24 times outdoors and 15 times indoors, including Newton High School's record streak of eight in a row (1952–1959). Massachusetts added an additional all-state meet including all divisions in the 1960s outdoors and 1980s indoors; Newton North has subsequently won all-state titles in 1977, 2002, 2004, 2005, 2013, 2016, 2017 and 2018. The 2004/2005 season featured both Division I and All-State titles in cross-country, indoor track, and outdoor track which completed a "Triple Crown" of championships. That year also featured a victory at the Penn Relays in the high school distance medley championship, which was the first relay victory by a Massachusetts high school in almost 50 years. In 2011, the Newton North sprint medley relay team and its four members were named All-American by the National Scholastic Sports Foundation. Newton High/Newton North athletes have won a high school national title (Warren Wittens in the 1936 intermediate hurdles; Carla Forbes in 2012 in the long jump and triple jump; Nick Fofana in 2014 in the decathlon Andrew Mah in 2018 in the 5000), an NCAA title (Carl Shine in the 1959 shot put), and run a four-minute mile equivalent (Tom Carleo ran 3:41 for 1500 and competed at the 1988 Olympic trials).

The Newton North girls' track teams have had their share of championships as well and have consistently been one of the top high school track teams in the state, winning Division I / Class A titles in 1989, 1990, 1992, 1996, 1998, 2004, 2005, 2010, 2011, 2012, and 2013. Additionally, they captured the All-State title in 1990, 1992, 1998, 2004, 2005,2010, 2011, 2012, and 2013. Along with those successes, they won more than 40 Conference and League Championships in the past 22 years. Their top-scoring athlete at state competition, Tanya Jones, won eleven individual Division I championships in the 300, 400, high jump, and long jump, and is the only athlete from either Newton North or Newton South high schools to score over 100 points at the state division / class meet level. Post-high-school, distance star Liz Natale finished 2nd at the 1986 NCAA Division I championship in the 3000m and was an All-American six times for University of Texas. The program has also had dozens of Nike All-Americans and New Balance All-Americans over the past ten years.

Other sports

The girls' soccer team has won five Division 1 State Championships, in 1989, 1992, 1996, 1999, and 2013, ranking as one of the top teams in the country. The boys' basketball team won the 2005 and 2006 Division 1 State Championships, and is considered one of the state's top basketball programs. They have captured the Bay State Championship five years in a row since 2004. The Newton North's boys' gymnastics team won four consecutive state championships from 1997 to 2000. The boys' tennis team won the Division 1 State Championship in 2002. In the spring of 2007, tennis doubles team Dan Razulis and Mike Greene won the MIAA State Doubles tournament. The boys' lacrosse team won three state championships from the years 1992–1996, ranking as one of the top teams in the country. In 2005–06, the boys' football team won the Bay State league championship and went on to the Division 1A State Championship super bowl. In 2006 and 2007 the boys' volleyball team won the sectional title and went on to the Division 1 State Championship. In 2014, the boys' baseball team won the Division 1A state title by winning the first MIAA Super 8 state tournament. The girls' volleyball team won back-to-back state championships in 2017 and 2018, and in 2018 was honored by the MaxPreps Tour of Champions as one of the top 50 high school teams in the country.

Theatre Ink

Theatre Ink is Newton North's theater department. Students work as directors, stage managers, student producers, and designers, and in backstage roles, in addition to onstage roles. All sets, lights, and sound for productions are designed, built, and operated by students. Theatre Ink uses two performance spaces, the Performing Arts Center, which is a standard proscenium theatre and seats approximately 600, and the little theatre, a roughly 200-seat theatre-in-the-round.

A typical season has several productions:
 Approximately three to five student-directed plays, one of which is often a musical. These plays are directed by teams of two, or rarely three, seniors who applied for the opportunity during their junior year.
 A large-scale musical performed in the main auditorium in the month of March. This production is usually the largest of the year, featuring the largest team of student actors, musicians, and crew members. Past musicals include Les Misérables (2003), My Fair Lady (2004), Bye Bye Birdie (2005), Chicago (2006), West Side Story (2007), Grease (2008), Anything Goes (2009), Cabaret (2010), Curtains (2011), and Legally Blonde (2012), How to Succeed in Business Without Really Trying (2013), Thoroughly Modern Millie (2014), Once Upon a Mattress (2015), Oliver! (2016), Fiddler on the Roof (2017), Cinderella (2018), and Rock of Ages (2019).
 A Shakespeare production in collaboration with Newton South High School's theater department, South Stage, featuring actors and crew members from both schools. Past shows include Twelfth Night (2004 and 2012), Henry IV, Part I (2005), A Midsummer Night's Dream (2006), The Tempest (2007), Romeo and Juliet (2008), Macbeth (2009), The Comedy of Errors (2011), and Hamlet (2011).
 Performances by the school's improvisation troupe, Spontaneous Generation, and sketch comedy troupe, Nitrous Oxide, and of contemporary musical theater, Cabaret Troupe, in concert style.
 The Playwrights' Festival, an evening featuring short plays written, directed and performed by students.
 Freshman Cabaret, also known as "FroshCab", is a showcase featuring ninth graders and directed by sophomores.

In 2016, Theatre Ink entered a production for the first time into the Massachusetts Educational Theatre Guild's annual statewide theatrical competition. Theatre Ink entered its production of Oliver!, the musical based on the Charles Dickens novel Oliver Twist. The production won several awards, including Best Acting Ensemble, Best Dance Ensemble, Best Hair & Makeup Design & Execution, and Best Overall Production.

Notable alumni
Jake Auchincloss (2006) – Congressman for the Massachusetts's 4th congressional district
Katharine Lee Bates (1878) – composer of "America the Beautiful"
Percy Williams Bridgman (1900) – physicist and philosopher of science, 1946 Nobel laureate
Louis C.K. (1985) – stand-up comedian, actor, producer, director, and writer
George R. Collins (1935) – art historian
Jim Corsi (1979) – Major League Baseball pitcher, notably for the Oakland Athletics and the Boston Red Sox
A. Joseph DeNucci (1955) – boxer and state auditor
Ronnie DeVoe (1986) – singer of R&B group New Edition
Dimitri Diatchenko (1986) – actor, notably in Chernobyl Diaries; musician
Anne Dudek (1993) – actress, notably in Mad Men, House, The Book Group and Covert Affairs
Caroline Ellison (2012) - CEO of Alameda Research
Houry Gebeshian (2007) – artistic gymnast, former Iowa Hawkeyes team member, Armenia national team member
Daniel Goldhagen (1977) – political scientist, former professor at Harvard University, author of Hitler's Willing Executioners
Stephen Greenblatt (1961) – Shakespeare scholar, academic, literary critic, pioneer of New Historicism
Peter Guber (around 1960) – Hollywood film producer, part owner of the LA Dodgers
Sean Gullette (1986) – writer; actor in Happy Accidents and Requiem for a Dream
Pete Hamilton (1960) – NASCAR driver and 1970 Daytona 500 winner
James Heywood (1985) – founder, ALS Therapy Development Foundation, co-founder of Patients Like Me
Stephen Heywood (1987) – artist, builder, and subject of documentary So Much So Fast
Warren Huston (1933) — infielder in Major League Baseball
Martin Karplus (1947) – chemist, winner of 2013 Nobel Prize in Chemistry
Matt LeBlanc (1985) – actor, notably in  Friends and Joey
Florencia Lozano (1987), actress, One Life to Live
Andy MacDonald (1992) – professional skateboarder
Elizabeth McCracken (1984) – author of Here's Your Hat What's Your Hurry, An Exact Replica of a Figment of My Imagination
Caitlin McGee (2006) – actress, notably in Bluff City Law, Modern Love, and Home Economics
Seth Mnookin (1990) – contributing editor for Vanity Fair; author of Hard News
Robert Morse (1949) – actor and singer, notably the 1961 original Broadway production and 1967 film adaptation of How to Succeed in Business Without Really Trying
Aoife O'Donovan (2002) – lead singer of the bluegrass band Crooked Still
Julie Palais (1974) – Antarctic researcher, glaciologist, climate change researcher
Seth Putnam (1985) – musician
James Remar (1971) – actor, notably in Mortal Kombat: Annihilation and Dexter
Michael Rosbash (1961) – biologist, 2017 Nobel Prize in Physiology or Medicine
Josh Roseman (1985) – musician, composer and producer
Mark Sandman (1970) – musician, bassist and vocalist of Morphine
Dana Adam Shapiro (1991) – co-director of Murderball, writer for Icon, Spin and New York Times magazines; author of The Every Boy
H. James Shea Jr. (1957) – member of the Massachusetts House of Representatives, anti-Vietnam War activist
James Harris Simons (1956) – mathematician, billionaire, founder of Renaissance Technologies and the Simons Foundation
Julie Taymor (1970) – theater director, The Lion King on Broadway; film director, notably of Across the Universe, Frida
Michael Thomas (1985) – author of Man Gone Down
Edward Chase Tolman (1904) – psychologist and prominent theorist of behaviorism
Richard Chase Tolman (1899) – physical chemist, physicist, and scientific advisor to the U.S. government
Liesl Tommy (1990) – theater and television director
Setti Warren (1988) – mayor of Newton and gubernatorial candidate
George T. Whitesides (1992) – CEO of Virgin Galactic and former chief of staff at NASA and former director of the National Space Society
Robert S. Woodworth (1887) – prominent early psychologist
Laura Zigman (1980) – author of Animal Husbandry (adapted into the film Someone like You), Dating Big Bird, Her, Piece of Work
Donnie Yen - Hong Kong actor, martial artist, and action director.
 Inducted to the Newton Public Schools athletic hall of fame.

Note: Alumni who graduated prior to 1974 are graduates of Newton High School.

References

External links

The Newtonite
The LigerBots
State Department of Education "Adequate Yearly Progress"
Newton North's Main Page at Great Schools
Newton North High School Building Project
Theatre Ink homepage
The Newton North Greengineering website
 Newton-Beijing Jingshan School Exchange Program
Photos of the new school on the Boston Globe website

Public high schools in Massachusetts
Schools in Newton, Massachusetts
Educational institutions established in 1859
Bay State Conference
1859 establishments in Massachusetts